Dubai Outlet City is a mixed-used development covering an area of , located in Dubailand. Dubai Outlet City consists of Dubai Outlet Mall, floating hotels, Somoa Hotel, Budget Hotel, and a cultural and entertainment centre.

Attractions

Dubai Outlet Mall
The Dubai Outlet Mall is the shopping centre located in Dubai Outlet City.

Oasis Beach & Promenade
A large portion of the Dubai Outlet City project has been linked with a water resort with an artificial beach in the middle of the desert.

See also
Dubai Outlet Mall
Dubailand
Dubai Lifestyle City

References

Dubailand.ae
Ameinfo.com
Dubaioutletmall

Buildings and structures under construction in Dubai
Dubailand